The High Commissioner of the United Kingdom to Tanzania is the United Kingdom's foremost diplomatic representative to the United Republic of Tanzania, and head of the UK's diplomatic mission in Tanzania.

As the United Kingdom and Tanzania are both members of the Commonwealth of Nations, they exchange High Commissioners rather than Ambassadors.

Tanzania was formed in 1964 by the union of the Republic of Tanganyika, formerly a British colony, which had gained independence in 1961, and the People's Republic of Zanzibar and Pemba, which had gained independence in December 1963. The People's Republic of Zanzibar had been created the previous year during a revolution in the Sultanate of Zanzibar, which 1890–1963 was a semi-independent Protectorate of the United Kingdom.

The High Commissioner to Tanzania is also the UK Representative to the East African Community.

List of heads of mission

Agent and Consul-General to the Sultanate of Zanzibar

1902–1904: Sir Charles Eliot (while he was Commissioner for the British East Africa Protectorate (later Kenya))

High Commissioner to Tanganyika

1961–1963: Sir Neil Pritchard

High Commissioners to the United Republic of Tanzania

1964–1965: Robert Fowler
1965–1968:   ''Diplomatic relations severed due to situation with Rhodesia
1968–1972: Horace Phillips
1972–1974: Arthur Kellas
1975–1978: Mervyn Brown
1978–1982: Peter Moon
1982–1985: John Sankey
1986–1989: Colin Imray
1989–1992: Thorold Masefield
1992–1995: Roger Westbrook
1995–1998: Alan Montgomery
1998–2001: Bruce Dinwiddy
2001–2003: Richard Clarke
2003–2006: Andrew Pocock
2006–2009: Philip Parham
2009–2013: Diane Corner
2013–2016: Dianna Melrose
2016-2020 Sarah Cooke,

2020–: David Concar

References

External links

UK and Tanzania, gov.uk

Tanzania
 
United Kingdom High Commissioners
United Kingdom and the Commonwealth of Nations
United Kingdom